André Onésime Gaston Guerrier (18 December 1874 – unknown) was a sailor from France, who represented his country at the 1924 Summer Olympics in Le Havre, France. Guerrier took the bronze in the 8 Metre.

References

Sources
 

French male sailors (sport)
Sailors at the 1924 Summer Olympics – 8 Metre
Olympic sailors of France
1874 births
Year of death missing
Sportspeople from Le Havre
Olympic bronze medalists for France
Olympic medalists in sailing
Medalists at the 1924 Summer Olympics